Lymphomatous acute lymphoblastic leukemia is a protein that in humans is encoded by the LALL gene.

References